Isaac C. Evans (born January 17, 1879 in Spring Green, Wisconsin) was a Democratic member of the Wisconsin State Assembly. He attended the University of Wisconsin–Madison and was a farmer and livestock dealer.

References

People from Spring Green, Wisconsin
University of Wisconsin–Madison alumni
Farmers from Wisconsin
1879 births
Year of death missing
Democratic Party members of the Wisconsin State Assembly